John Craige (July 24, 1886 – August 14, 1954) was an American wrestler. He competed in the men's freestyle middleweight at the 1908 Summer Olympics.

References

1886 births
1954 deaths
American male sport wrestlers
Olympic wrestlers of the United States
Wrestlers at the 1908 Summer Olympics
Sportspeople from Philadelphia